Tocaloma (Miwok: Tokoloma, meaning "salamander") is an unincorporated community in Marin County, California. By vehicle, it is near the McIsaac's ranch on Sir Francis Drake Boulevard just east of the ascent  to the ridge before Olema.

A post office operated at Tocaloma from 1891 to 1919.

References

Further reading

Unincorporated communities in California
Unincorporated communities in Marin County, California